Tivat is a coastal town in southwest Montenegro, located in the Bay of Kotor. , its population was 9,367. Tivat is the centre of Tivat Municipality, which is the smallest municipality by area in Montenegro.

Name
In Serbian and Montenegrin, the city is known as Tivat (Тиват); in Italian and Venetian as Teodo. The town was first mentioned in the 14th century records of Kotor, as Teude, Theode, and Theudo, and has been connected to the Illyrian Queen Teuta, who ruled the region in 3rd century BC. Teuta had a residence in Rhizon and a summer residence between the church of St. Rocco in Donja Lastva and Seljanovo. The name could also come from the Greek word "Θείοδος" (Theiodos, meaning "way of God"), or from the names of old Christian saints: Theodulus, Theodocius or Theodotus. Besides the popular name Theudo, a Latin expression, Latus Tiuveti, comes from the 16th century. Finally, the name could originate from the Celtic word touto, town.

History
Archaeological sites attest that the area was inhabited in antiquity, with Greek and Roman settlements. Tombs and tombstones from the Roman period were discovered in Lastva and Opatovo.

Tivat is the youngest town in the Bay of Kotor area and was established on the plateau at the bottom of the Vrmac. During the Middle Ages, the fertile lands of the area belonged mostly to the aristocrats of Kotor, Prčanj and Dobrota. Estates, castles and chalets were there as well as the collective church of St Anton dating from 1373. Part of this inheritance, which was the property of the wealthy Buća family, is a historic chalet which today houses Tivat's museums and galleries. The residence of the metropolitan of the bishopric of Zeta was built from the 13th to the 15th century on the Prevlaka Island. Tivat, known as Teodo in Venetian, was under the Republic of Venice as a part of Albania Veneta from 1420 to 1797. In those centuries Teodo enjoyed economic development that attracted many Serb refugees from Ottoman-held areas. Some Venetian-style buildings are still standing today.

Rapid development of Tivat started in the second half of 19th century when the Austrian empire built a maritime arsenal for its fleet. Still the town shaped itself by developing small industry. In the beginning of 1918, in the Tivat Bay sailors revolted against the mighty Austrian empire. With great approval and support, people from this area followed their revolutionary actions. The period between two world wars was marked with syndicate activity in Račica, Krtoli and Arsenal. Between 1941 and 1943 the town was part of the Italian Governatorate of Dalmatia.

In 1889 the Naval arsenal was built by Austrians, and was later used as a naval military base of the Italian Navy, the Yugoslav People's Army and the Army of Montenegro. The JNA enjoyed an international reputation as a powerful, well-equipped, and well-trained force. The base was also used by Russia and Libya as the technical base for maintenance, repair and overhaul (MRO) of their ships and submarines.

Porto Montenegro 
The former naval base is now "Porto Montenegro", a superyacht marina developed by Hungarian-Canadian billionaire Peter Munk, then sold in 2016 to the Investment Corporation of Dubai.

Geography

Tivat is located in the central part of the Bay of Kotor (Boka Kotorska, or simply "Boka"), south of mount Vrmac. The municipality lies mostly south of the town, and has an exit to open sea at the tourist location Pržno inlet near Radovići village to the south. Its central part, where Tivat Airport is located, lies in fertile Grbalj valley. The airport is located near the isthmus of Luštica peninsula, which belongs to the municipality of Herceg Novi for the most part.

Tivat has about 14,000 inhabitants. Geomorphologically, Tivat is composed of three areas. The first is the hills and peaks of Vrmac, Velji Vrh and Popova glava. Water activity formed capes Seljanovo, Pakovo and Račica. The second area is Tivat field, flattened by water activity. The third area is Krtoli with islands – Island of Flowers, St. Marko, and Lady of Mercy which is bordered by Novski bay on the north-west and Grbalj area on the south-east.

Population

Tivat is the administrative centre of Tivat municipality, which has a population of 14,031 and the town itself has a population of 9,367 (2011).

In 1981 the municipality had a population of 9,315:
 2,876 Croats
 2,831 Montenegrins
 2,384 Yugoslavs
 850 Serbs
 129 Albanians
 155 others

In 1991 the municipality had a population of 11,404:
 3,809 Montenegrins (33.4%)
 2,663 Croats (23.35%)
 2,346 Yugoslavs (20.57%)
 1,724 Serbs (15.11%)
 219 ethnic Muslims (1.92%)
 485 others (4.27%)

In 2011 the municipality had a population of 14,031:
4,666 Montenegrins (33.25%)
4,435 Serbs (31.61%)
2,304 Croats (16.42%)
2,626 others/undeclared (18,71%)

Languages
 5,493 Serbian (38.93%)
 4,319 Montenegrin (30.61%)
 1,167 Croatian (8.27%)
 3,132 rest and undeclared (22.19%)

Sports
The local football team is FK Arsenal Tivat, who have spent several seasons in the country's second tier. They share their Stadion u Parku with rugby team RFC Arsenal Tivat. The town's basketball team is KK Teodo Tivat.

Tourism

Already a popular tourist resort, Tivat is set to become a nautical tourism centre for the southern Adriatic.

The inlets near Prevlaka, as well as the localities of Župa and Kalimanj, provide great conditions for the construction of marinas and yachting clubs. Canadian businessman Peter Munk bought a naval shipyard in Tivat, intending to transform it into a luxury vacation resort and a marina for luxury yachts called Porto Montenegro.

In 1971 Tivat Airport acquired a modern runway and is now a significant airport for foreign air traffic. It served 1,367,282 passengers in 2019.

Although it is the youngest town in the Boka region, Tivat has a number of tourist sites. In the city itself there is the natural port Kalimanj. There is also a choice of cultural events, such as "Bocce Olympiad" and "Summer Fest". Tivat boasts a botanic garden planted with gifts from Bokan sailors who brought back a wide variety of exotic tree species and ornamental plants from their voyages.

Transport

Tivat is connected with the rest of Montenegro by the Adriatic Highway, a two-laned road that runs down the length of Montenegrin coast. Travelling inland is possible by leaving the Adriatic Highway at Budva or Sutomore (through the Sozina tunnel).

A ferry operates on the Kamenari - Lepetane line across the Verige strait, eliminating the need to go all the way around Boka Kotorska bay in order to reach the Herceg Novi riviera. It is speculated that a future Verige bridge will be constructed across the bay.

This is the biggest airport in Montenegro, although Podgorica airport is more modern. There are regular flights to Belgrade throughout the year, and dozens of charter planes land daily at Tivat Airport during the summer season.

International relations

Twin towns — Sister cities
Tivat is twinned with:

 Aleksin, Russia
 Jiading, China
 Karpoš, North Macedonia
 Konjic, Bosnia and Herzegovina
 Mola di Bari, Italy
 Novi Sad, Serbia
 Piran, Slovenia
 San Giacomo degli Schiavoni, Italy
 Sremski Karlovci, Serbia
 Trogir, Croatia
 Ub, Serbia

Gallery

References

Bibliography 
 Calabrese M., Mola di Bari: colori suoni memorie di Puglia, Laterza, Bari, 1987.

External links

360 PANOTOUR TIVAT
Destination-Montenegro.com
Visit-Montenegro.com
Photo-Montenegro.com
 Tivat Travel Guide
 Tourist Organization of Tivat
A New Playground for the Rich - slideshow by The New York Times

 
Populated places in Tivat Municipality
Tivat Municipality
Coastal towns in Montenegro
Mediterranean port cities and towns in Montenegro
Populated places in Bay of Kotor